Szot is a Polish surname. Notable people with the surname include:

 Dawid Szot (born 2001), Polish footballer

 Patrick Szot (born 1994), Polish-American Graphic Designer

Paulo Szot (born 1969), Brazilian operatic baritone singer and actor
Walt Szot (1920–1981), American football player

Polish-language surnames